Alumni and faculty of Columbia Theological Seminary include prominent religious leaders and theologians. Columbia Theological Seminary is a Presbyterian seminary in Decatur, Georgia.  It is one of ten theological institutions affiliated with the Presbyterian Church (USA).

Alumni

Alumni, 1925-present (Decatur, GA campus)
C. Hassell Bullock, B.D. 1964
Charles Cousar, B.D. 1958
D. James Kennedy, graduate
John C. Knapp, graduate, author, speaker, college president
John H. Leith, graduate
Peter Marshall, 1931 graduate, twice Chaplain of the United States Senate
Ben Mathes, graduate, Missionary, founder of Rivers of the World
J. Vernon McGee, graduate (1933), founder of Thru The Bible Radio Network
Ian Punnett, graduate, radio talk show host
James M. Robinson, 1946 graduate, New Testament scholar, son of William Childs Robinson (1897-1982), who taught church history and apologetics at Columbia Theological Seminary

Alumni, 1828-1925 (Columbia, SC campus)
William Alderman Linton, missionary, founder of Hannam University in Korea
Benjamin Morgan Palmer, graduate (1841); Professor of Church History and Polity (1854-1856), first Moderator of the Presbyterian Church in the Confederate States.
John Leighton Wilson, 1833 graduate; first missionaries to West Africa by the American Board of Commissioners for Foreign Missions.

Faculty

Current faculty
William P. Brown, William Marcellus McPheeters Professor of Old Testament, writer
Kathy Dawson, Associate Professor of Christian Education; Director of MAPT program
Mark Douglas (Ethicist), Professor of Christian Ethics; Director of M.Div. program
Anna Carter Florence, Peter Marshall Associate Professor of Preaching
Israel Galindo, Associate Dean for Lifelong Learning
Martha L. Moore-Keish, J.B. Green Professor of Theology
Marcia Y. Riggs, J. Erskine Love Professor of Christian Ethics, writer
Love L. Sechrest, Dean of the Faculty and Vice President for Academic Affairs 
Jeffery Tribble, Associate Professor of Ministry
Haruko Nawata Ward, Professor of Church History
Ralph Watkins, Peachtree Associate Professor of Evangelism and Church Growth
Christine Roy Yoder, J. McDowell Richards Professor of Biblical Interpretation

Faculty emeriti
Walter Brueggemann, Old Testament Professor Emeritus, theologian and writer
Erskine Clarke, Professor Emeritus, religious historian
Catherine Gunsalus Gonzalez, Professor Emerita, writer
Elizabeth Johnson (New Testament Scholar), J. Davison Philips Professor of New Testament
Sara Myers, Professor Emerita, theological librarian
Kathleen M. O'Connor, Old Testament Professor Emerita, writer
George Stroup, J.B. Green Professor Emeritus of Theology, author
Brian Wren, Conant Professor of Worship

Past faculty, 1925-present (Decatur, GA campus)
David L. Bartlett, Professor Emeritus, writer.
Barbara Brown Taylor, Adjunct Professor of Christian Spirituality, and well-known Episcopal priest and writer.
G. Thompson Brown, (1921-2014), Professor Emeritus, writer, missionary, Director of the Division of International Mission for the Presbyterian Church (US) (1967–1980), founder of Honam Theological Academy (now Honam Theological University and Seminary).
Pamela Cooper-White, Ben G and Nancye Clapp Gautier Professor of Pastoral Theology, Care and Counseling. writer.
Charles Cousar, (1933-2014) Professor Emeritus, New Testament scholar, author.
Justo Gonzalez, adjunct professor with an international reputation for his contributions to Historical theology.
Shirley Guthrie, J.B. Green Professor of Systematic Theology.
Joan Gray, Interim Vice President for Student Services and Dean of Students, former Moderator of the 217th General Assembly.
Ben Campbell Johnson, Professor Emeritus of Evangelism, former Director of Spirituality, writer.
Kimberly Bracken Long, Associate Professor of Worship
Deborah Flemister Mullen, Dean of Faculty/Executive Vice President, Associate Professor of American Christianity and Black Church Studies
Rodger Nishioka, Benton Family Associate Professor of Christian Education
Syngman Rhee (Presbyterian minister), (1931-2015), Distinguished Visiting Professor for Global Leadership Development
Ronald Wallace, (1911–2006), Professor of Biblical Theology and brother-in-law of Thomas F. Torrance, J. B. Torrance, and David W. Torrance

Past faculty, 1828-1925 (Columbia, SC campus)
Charles Colcock Jones, Sr., professor (1835–38, 1847–50), patriarch of the family chronicled in Children of Pride (1972) and Erskine Clarke's Dwelling Place (2005).
William Swan Plumer, (1802-1880), Professor of Didactic and Polemic Theology (1867-1875) and Professor of Pastoral, Casuistic, and Historical Theology (1875-1880).
James Henley Thornwell, (1812-1862) professor of theology post-1855; president of South Carolina College, leader in organizing the Presbyterian Church in the Confederate States.
Joseph R. Wilson, father of Woodrow Wilson, faculty member following the Civil War.
James Woodrow, first Perkins Professor of Natural Science, uncle of President Woodrow Wilson and controversial professor
John L. Girardeau, Professor of systematic theology.

References

Lists of people by university or college in Georgia (U.S. state)